Apollo Theatre (Spanish: Teatro Apolo is a 1950 Spanish musical film directed by Rafael Gil and starring Jorge Negrete, María de los Ángeles Morales and Juan Espantaleón. It takes its title from the Teatro Apolo in Madrid.

Cast
 Jorge Negrete as Miguel Velasco  
 María de los Ángeles Morales as Celia Morales  
 Juan Espantaleón as Don Antonio  
 Julia Lajos as Doña Flora  
 María Asquerino as Elena Ramos  
 Luis Hurtado
 Manuel Arbó 
 Francisco Pierrá 
 Luis Pérez de León
 Antonio Riquelme as Aspirante a sustituir

References

Bibliography
 Labanyi, Jo & Pavlović, Tatjana. A Companion to Spanish Cinema. John Wiley & Sons, 2012.

External links 

1950 films
1950 musical films
Spanish musical films
1950s Spanish-language films
Films directed by Rafael Gil
Suevia Films films
Films produced by Cesáreo González
Spanish black-and-white films
1950s Spanish films